Cave Johnson is a fictional character from the Portal franchise first introduced in the 2011 video game Portal 2. He is voiced by American actor J. K. Simmons and created in part by Portal 2s designer Erik Wolpaw. He is referenced by a computer username in the first game and appears indirectly in Portal 2. Johnson serves as a guide to the player-character Chell as she explores an abandoned part of the Aperture Science facility, though all of his messages are pre-recorded from before the events of the Portal games.

Concept and creation
Cave Johnson was created by designer Erik Wolpaw and is voiced by J. K. Simmons. He is described as an "eccentric dead billionaire" and "extroverted, enthusiastic, and opinionated." He was the founder and CEO of Aperture Science. He was also a "shower curtain visionary." He was initially considered to be the main character of Portal 2, where players were in control of him as he was trapped inside a computer. This idea was scrapped however. They later envisioned Cave Johnson as the primary antagonist, but this was also scrapped. This idea was revealed as a result of leaked quotes from the character.

Johnson was envisioned since Portal as an "industrial, Southern guy" who would contrast with the "anti-septic" and "politically correct" nature of Aperture Science. Though the idea of the character underwent several changes over the development, the selection of J.K. Simmons helped solidify the character. Pictures of Cave Johnson appear throughout Portal 2, and though Valve used a casting call to try to find someone to use as a template, they turned back to their own lead animator, Bill Fletcher, for Cave's face.

Though comparisons have been made between Cave and Andrew Ryan, the wealthy industrialist who created the fictional underwater city of Rapture in BioShock, Wolpaw claims they had not considered this character in their creation of Cave.

Appearances
Cave Johnson's only full appearance to date is in the 2011 video game Portal 2, having been referenced by a login username in the first Portal game in 2007. Johnson's voice actor, J.K. Simmons, spoke original lines for various trailers for Portal 2, including at the PAX East exposition in 2011.

Cave Johnson does not appear directly in Portal 2, but his image is seen in paintings and his voice is heard in pre-recorded messages as Chell traverses abandoned parts of the Aperture Science facility. These messages explain the area the player character has entered,  as well as some of the backstory of the company. In these pre-recorded messages, he is sometimes accompanied by or makes reference to his personal assistant, a woman named Caroline. As Chell progresses through this area, the messages appear to indicate a decline in the company as well as in Johnson himself. The recordings reveal that Johnson eventually contracted a deadly illness after grinding up moon rocks to turn into Conversion Gel (in keeping with a previous comment that Aperture's research policy is to "throw science at the wall and see what sticks"); he explains that the dust was deadly poisonous, and begins discussing the prospect of putting a person's mind inside of a computer. Johnson indicates that if the process isn't able to be done on him before he dies, Caroline should be put in charge, by force if necessary. This leads the player to find out that Caroline is, in fact, the personality on which the GLaDOS computer system, which controls Aperture Science's testing course, is based.

An alternate version of Cave Johnson, known as "Cave Prime of Earth-1" appears in the Perpetual Testing Initiative update. This Cave's assistant is Greg rather than Caroline. Cave Prime sends the player once again to fulfill the role of test subject - this time as silent stick figure Bendy. After proving the multiverse theory, Cave Prime decides to send test subjects to test in other universes so he can avoid the cost of building test rooms in his own universe, while also asking the player to watch out in case he finds "Moneyverse", a universe made entirely of US Dollars, and to avoid a "Pesoverse". After overhearing Caves from other universes, Cave Prime asserts his identity by adding the codeword "chariots chariots" at the end of his sentences. Cave Prime watches as Bendy travels through several universes, like the Cat Universe, where everyone is a cat; the Dancing Universe, where everyone is required by law to never stop dancing, even while testing; the Light Universe, where everyone was transformed into beings of pure light, as part of a failed experiment, as their goal was to turn everyone into pillars of pure salt; and a Universe where the Earth is run entirely by women. Cavina Johnson, this universe's Cave, insists that she and her assistant, Sally-Sue-Greg, are women, being strongly implied that they are actually men. Cave Prime cancels the GLaDOS project after seeing a universe where Cave uploaded his consciousness onto a computer, but gone mad after getting bored of being Pure Intellect. Another universe has Cave buying out Black Mesa and renaming it "Blapature Mesa", and canceling the experiment that would eventually lead to the alien invasion seen in Half-Life.

Cave Prime comes at odds with his evil self, known as "Dark Cave", who has the codeword "chariots chariots chariots", and comes from a universe where people breathe methane, eat only asparagus, and have a portal gun which can portal in any surface. Dark Cave tries bribing the player into giving him the Moneyverse. When two Moneyverses are discovered, Cave Prime and Dark Cave decide to split the findings, meaning that they're both wealthy enough to no longer need to test in alternate universes.

J.K. Simmons returned to the role for Lego Dimensions, and is able to be heard throughout the Portal 2 adventure world and bonus level. In his Lego Dimensions appearance, Cave Johnson has put his own consciousness in a Personality Core.

In 2022, Simmons once again reprised his role as Cave Johnson for the Steam Deck tech demo Aperture Desk Job. The game takes place some years after Cave's body has died, but his personality has been implanted in a giant computer encased in a stone carving of his own head.

Reception

1UP.com's Steve Watts compared Cave Johnson to the industrialist Howard Hughes. A writer for Edge wrote that the "surprise star turn" was J.K. Simmons as Cave Johnson. The editor described him as a "gruff and acid alpha male who set up Aperture, who performs with real brio and bite" and that while it would be hard to quote him, his lines were "perfectly pitched, and funny to the bone". PALGNs Adam Ghiggino wrote that the dialogue of Portal 2 was funny and cited Simmons as an example. GamesRadar's Tyler Wilde called Cave "bombastic" and praised Simmons for "perfectly" portraying him. GameSpy's Will Tuttle wrote that it is "hard not to feel oddly honored to take part in some of the experiments that ranged across his entire career". He also wrote of Simmons that his voice "adeptly blend gravitas and silliness, and I found his segment to be just as great the second time I played through the game". GamePros Will Herring wrote that Valve should be "commended" for the introduction of the character. Official Xbox Magazines Jon Hicks described Cave as a "cigar-chewing, damn-the-expense-and-particularly-the-health-restrictions" type.

Computer and Video Games' Andy Robinson described Cave's personality as "loud" and that Simmons is "on form here". GameZone's Ben PerLee described Cave as "the typical tycoon mastermind/crazy man, so stubborn in his ways, government and basic human rights be damned" and that "his suggested history with GLaDOS provides an amazing focal point for the second entry". PC Gamers Dan Stapleton wrote that Cave's "comically sociopathic approach to science is second only to GLaDOS’". He also praised Simmons for his portrayal of Cave because of his "fittingly cantankerous voice". Giant Bomb's Ryan Davis called Simmons' portrayal "terrific" and described Simmons as a "perennial tough-talker and boss-man-type". CNN's Larry Frum praised Cave's "sarcastic, shoot-from-the-hip attitude" for its contribution to the game's dialogue. ABC News' Lou Kesten wrote that Cave was a "memorable" character, and that Simmons helped in portraying what he thought was one of the three "most distinctive characters in video games" along with Wheatley and GLaDOS. The Wall Street Journals Ryan Kuo wrote that Cave's "gruff proclamations are somewhat more grating than his synthetic counterparts" and that "for better or worse, it’s also impossible to un-see J.K. Simmons once you know it’s him speaking".

Professor G. Christopher Williams discussed the relationship between Caroline, the form she held before she became GLaDOS, and Cave Johnson. He wrote that the relationship of Caroline and Johnson fulfilled the "adage that 'behind every good man is a good woman,' since he depends on Caroline to fulfill the role of executing his directives as well as providing comfort and support for the man in charge, himself". He added that "while Johnson warns his listeners jokingly that 'pretty as a postcard' Caroline is off limits because 'She’s married. To Science,' he may as well be simply warning off potential suitors for personal reasons" and wrote that "he is the 'science' that she has married herself to."

References

Fictional American people in video games
Fictional con artists
Fictional businesspeople in video games
Fictional inventors in video games
Male characters in video games
Portal characters
Video game characters introduced in 2011